Stuart Mark Hole (born 17 July 1985) is a former English cricketer.  Hole is a right-handed batsman who bowls right-arm medium pace.  He was born at Oxford, Oxfordshire.

Hole played 2 first-class matches for Warwickshire.  His first-class debut came against Yorkshire in the 2007 County Championship.  His second and final first-class match came against Cambridge University in 2008.  In his 2 first-class matches, he scored 24 runs at a batting average of 24 and a high score of 24.  With the ball he took 2 wickets at a bowling average of 52.52, with best figures of 2/29.  He also played 2 List-A matches for Warwickshire against Essex and Sussex in the 2007 Friends Provident Trophy.  In his 2 List-A matches, he wasn't required to bat and with the ball took a single wicket at a cost of 16 runs.  He was released by Warwickshire at the end of the 2008 season.

Hole has also represented Oxfordshire in the Minor Counties Championship, making his debut for the county in that competition in 2005 against Devon.  From 2005 to present, he has represented the county in 11 Championship matches.  Hole has also represented Oxfordshire in the MCCA Knockout Trophy, with his debut in that competition coming against Cumberland in 2005.  From 2005 to present, he has represented the county in 9 Trophy matches.

References

External links
Stuart Hole at Cricinfo
Stuart Hole at CricketArchive

1985 births
Living people
Cricketers from Oxford
English cricketers
Oxfordshire cricketers
Warwickshire cricketers